Renaud Dion (born 6 January 1978) is a French former professional road racing cyclist, who competed professionally between 2004 and 2013 for the , ,  and  teams. His sporting career began with UC Gien Sport.

Major results

2006
 1st Memorial Samyn
2010
 2nd Tro-Bro Léon
2011
 1st Route Adélie
2013
 8th Overall Tour de Normandie

References

External links
L'Equipe rider profile

French male cyclists
1978 births
Living people
People from Gien
Sportspeople from Loiret
Cyclists from Centre-Val de Loire